The Ambarnath Marathi Film Festival (also known as AMFF) is held every year in the city of Ambarnath, in the state of Maharashtra in India. Festival conducted by Akhil Bhartiya Marathi Chitrapat Mahamandal, and Ambar Bharari.

The festival has taken place annually in October–November since 2015. Festival allows entry to Release - Unreleased marathi film, short-film's of year. The festival is arranged by Ambar Bharari President Sunil Chaudhari, Nikhil Chaudhari and President of Akhil Bhartiya Marathi Chitrapat Mahamandal. Mahendra Patil is the Director of the festival. Third film festival has been held in Sept - Oct 2017 in which 30 films and 50 Short films has been screened. Award Ceremony is scheduled on 26 November 2017.,

Awards 
Ambarnath Film Festival has 35 different category awards for films, 10 categories for short-films,

See also 
 Marathi cinema
 Cinema of India
 Film festival
 List of film festivals in India

References

Film festivals in Maharashtra
Film industry in Mumbai
Marathi cinema
Marathi-language films
Festivals in Mumbai
Ambarnath